{{Infobox university
|name                  = 
|image                 = Benito Soliven Academy logo.JPG
|native_name           = ''Benito Soliven Academy (Mataas na Paaralan ng Benito Soliven)|motto                 = "Pro Deo Et Patria"
|established           = April 1948
|type                  = Private Sectarian
|director              = Lovell U. Soller
|principal             = Marivic F. Realin
|students              = 320
|faculty               = 22
|administrative_staff  = 35
|city                  = Santo Domingo
|province              = Ilocos Sur
|country               = Philippines
|academic_affiliations = Catholic Educational Association of the Philippines (CEAP)
|colors                = Green, red, yellow, blue
|logo                  = 
}}Benito Soliven Academy''' is a private secondary school under the Roman Catholic order, conceived by Rev. Fr. Mariano Flores Pacis, parish priest of Santo Domingo, located in Poblacion Santo Domingo, Ilocos Sur. The Academy was run by the Diocese of Santo Domingo, but the operation, management and supervision were later transferred to the Roman Catholic Archdiocese of Nueva Segovia, during the time of Archbishop Msgr. Juan C. Sison. The Archdiocesan School Board of Trustees and corporators was organized with the Archbishop as the chairman. The parish priest automatically becomes the School Director unless otherwise another one is appointed by the Archdiocesan Chairman.

The main campus of the institution is located at the western area of the Santo Domingo Parish Church grounds, where a 2-storey building with 14 classrooms is located. It is the only Catholic School in Santo Domingo, Ilocos Sur.

History

Benito Soliven Academy began as a parochial secondary/high school in 1948.

The academy is named after the Hon. Benito T. Soliven, who studied law at the University of the Philippines, graduated summa cum laude, placed third in the 1921 bar examinations, the first lawyer of Santo Domingo, Ilocos Sur, an intellectual, a linguist, a successful political leader, an Outstanding Congressman, a three-termer in the House of Representatives acclaimed as "Valedictorian" in congress having the greatest number of bills most of which were passed/approved by his colleagues, a hero of World War II, and most of all a very saintly and charitable man, ready to help his less fortunate clients free of charge, and always at the service of the needy. He is the father of the late Maximo Villaflor Soliven, a prominent journalist and publisher and realtor Victorio Villaflor Soliven, the owner of VV Soliven Towers located near the Santolan MRT Station along Epifanio de los Santos Avenue. A town in the province of Isabela is also named after him.

With the full support and backing up of the late Rev. Fr. Msgr. Crisanto Padernal who was the former parish priest of Santo Domingo for 25 years and later assigned as a parish priest of Vigan City and concurrently Archdiocesan Procurator the late Archbishop Msgr. Santiago Sancho approved the request to open a Catholic School in the town.
 
The first School Board was composed of Fr. Mariano Flores Pacis as chairman and its members were Atty. Faustino Tobia, the late Mayor Filomeno Tadena, Mr. Juan Raquel, Mr. Faustino Tamargo, Mr. Jesus Tobias and Mr. Maximo Molina, the board applied to the Department of Education and Culture for a permit to open a secondary school. It was approved and a government recognition was issued in April 1948, Reg. No. 3935. It was then officially registered to the Securities and Exchange Commission (SEC) in October 1948.

According to Fr. Mariano F. Pacis when asked why he was all out in putting up a Catholic Secondary School in the town he said that the Aglipayan Church who had a number of followers then at the time had plans to put up an Aglipayan School, so Fr. Pacis tried his best to go ahead of such plan. He therefore, convened some of the prominent people of the town. Putting their good heads together, they came up with the name of the school - Benito Soliven Academy.

To start the school year 1948-1949 of operation, a team of the Board of Directors went patiently to the different barrios or barangays of the Municipality campaigning for first and second year students to enroll in Benito Soliven Academy. So there were 74 students enrolled, 52 in the 1st year and 22 in the 2nd year. In school year 1949-1950 there was a total of 161 students enrolled from the 1st to the 4th year. In the 4th year, there were 11 enrollees: 6 boys and 5 girls but only 10 of them were graduated.

From 1948, the enrollment had gradually increased year by year with a greater number of graduation, but with the establishment of the Lussoc National High School in the mid '70s enrollment somewhat decreased since most of the elementary graduates in the eastern barangays enrolled in that school. Furthermore, the establishment of Naglaoa-an National High School which served the elementary graduates of the western barangays of the town, and the Puro National High School of Magsingal tremendously decreased the enrollment in Benito Soliven Academy, prompting the Archdiocese of Nueva Segovia to subsidize the deficit to meet the minimum funds the academy needs.

It is worthwhile mentioning the first self-sacrificing mentors of the school - the late Mr. Juan Raquel, Mr. Faustino Tamargo, Mr. Jesus Tobias and Miss Petra Bumatay. On the onset of the 1950s came Mrs. Caridad Villafuerte, Miss Carolina Tagorda, Mrs. Concepcion T. Briones, Mrs. Guadalupe J. Dumag, and Miss Consolacion Pacis (sister of Fr. Mariano F. Pacis). A lot of belt-tightening and patience were incurred by these early teachers, for salaries were drawn more from parish funds rather than from tuition fees of the students. The students' fees weren't enough to subsidize the teachers' compensations and other school needs. Often, tuition fees were paid in kind like eggs, rice, chicken, goat etc. which were then accepted by the director. As a matter of fact, teachers were paid only three times a year at those times, first upon enrollment, second on All Souls' Day, and third at the closing of the school year with a salary ranging from P100 to P150 a month. The teachers, who were more on service rather than monetary rewards, didn't complain for they have full knowledge and understanding on the financial situation of the school.

With the coming of new administration in 1996, Archbishop Orlando Quevedo informed the Benito Soliven Academy community about his plan to close the school for fear that the Archdiocese may not be able to subsidize the deficit. He gave the new administration only a year to work for its survival. With the able leadership of then principal of the Academy, Mrs. Guadalupe J. Dumag, a written appeal together with the project proposals were given to the Archbishop to help the administration secure funds from Germany and Switzerland. The Archbishop finally brought home the bacon for Benito Soliven Academy.

The administration did not stop there. It moved out from its nutshell to approach Realtor Victorio V. Soliven, the son of Hon. Benito  T. Soliven. Understanding the sad plight of the school and to save the living memory of his late father, he gave outright an amount as "seed money" for the school to invest and whatever profit it gave was used for school needs and improvements.

To work out for the increase of enrollment, the Benito Soliven Academy community continuously intensified its campaign to all schools in the barangays with Grade VI Graduates offering full scholarships to Valedictorians and half tuition fees for Salutatorians, and offering computer education for 1st to 4th year students, giving emphasis on academic excellence, discipline, moral and spiritual values.

Benito Soliven Academy can now boast of its complete school plant – laboratory room with updated laboratory apparatus, equipment and facilities, canteen, a conducive functional library, a covered court and a new computer room. The funds for the refurbishment of the school, came mainly from alumni and parents both local and abroad, by giving something back to the institution which is now a source of pride of the town.

Benito Soliven Academy has come a long way. It is now the proud alma mater of the countless professionals, town officials, and respected leaders and members of the community of Santo Domingo, Ilocos Sur and its surrounding towns.

Management

Administrators

Gallery

See also

 Ilocos Sur History/Ilocos Sur Story/Recent Trends
 Private School
 Education in the Philippines
 Ilocano People/Notable Ilocanos
 List of Roman Catholic archdioceses
 Bataan Death March

References

Sources
 Benito Soliven Academy Yesterday and Today (1948–2008), Guadalupe J. Dumag, BSA Publications (2008)

External links
Official Website of Municipality of Santo Domingo, Ilocos Sur
 UP Law Inaugurates Benito T. Soliven Seminar-Room

Schools in Ilocos Sur
Catholic secondary schools in the Philippines
Christian schools in the Philippines